Harpalus impressus is a species of ground beetle in the subfamily Harpalinae. It was described by Roth in 1851.

References

impressus
Beetles described in 1851